is a Japanese actor. He won the award for best supporting actor at the 2nd Yokohama Film Festival for Shiki Natsuko and Yūgure made and at the 6th and 7th Japan Academy Prizes.

Filmography

Films
 Wanpaku Ōji no Orochi Taiji (1963) – childhood Zushiōmaru (voice, credited as Tomohito Sumita)
 Shiki Natsuko (1980)
 Yūgure made (1980)
 Fall Guy (1982) – Ginshirō
 Theater of Life (1983)
 Shanghai Rhapsody (1984)
 The Tale of Genji (1987)
 A Chaos of Flowers (1988)
 Samurai Fiction (1998)
 The Wind Rises (2013) – Satomi (voice)
 A Bolt from the Blue (2014)
 Honnō-ji Hotel (2017)
 Flea-picking Samurai (2018)
 Underdog (2020)
 Asakusa Kid (2021)

Television drama
Onna Taikōki (1981) – Azai Nagamasa
Byakkotai (1986) – Matsudaira Katamori
Unmeitōge (1993)
Furuhata Ninzaburō (1996)
Celeb to Binbō Tarō (2008)
Massan (2015) – Kumatora Morino
Segodon (2018) – Saigō Kichibei
Yell (2020) – Mohei Gondō
Japan Sinks: People of Hope (2021) – Makoto Ikushima
Lost Man Found (2022) – Satoru's father
 Atom's Last Shot (2022) – Shigeo Tominaga

Television animation
Akagi (2005–06) – Urabe

Live-action
The X-Files (TV Asahi edition) – Fox Mulder (David Duchovny)

Animation
The Simpsons – Fox Mulder

References

External links
 

1949 births
Living people
Japanese male actors
People from Tokyo
Recipients of the Medal with Purple Ribbon